Robert William Patrick Broeg (March 18, 1918 – October 28, 2005) was an American sportswriter.

Born and raised in St. Louis, Missouri, he officially covered the St. Louis Cardinals for forty years. He graduated from Cleveland High School (Class of '36) and the University of Missouri before entering the United States Marines. He served in Washington as a result of an eye injury suffered at birth.

After the war, Broeg joined the St. Louis Post-Dispatch. He was privy to many important events in baseball history. Broeg was partially responsible for the famous picture of Eddie Gaedel at the plate in 1951. He told the photographer to stay at the game until Gaedel came to the plate and the picture was taken.

Later, he helped Bob Gibson win the 1967 World Series. Gibson was unable to get breakfast at the Cardinals' hotel in Boston, so Broeg delivered a ham and egg sandwich to the star right-hander. Gibson pitched a complete game and carried his team to victory.

Among other things, Broeg is known for coining the nickname "Stan the Man" for Cardinal baseball player Stan Musial, championing the Hall of Fame causes of Cardinals Red Schoendienst, Enos Slaughter and Chick Hafey and helping to devise, and successfully push for the first pension plan for veteran major-league players.

Broeg was named to the board of directors of the Baseball Hall of Fame in 1972, a position he held for 28 years. He was also a longtime member of the Committee on Baseball Veterans. His knowledge was reported to be encyclopedic, even into his 80s. His willingness to share that knowledge with everyone from colleagues and loyal readers to complete strangers at the ballpark or on the street endeared him to fans spanning multiple generations. He penned his last column in 2004.

The St. Louis chapter of the Society for American Baseball Research is named for Bob Broeg. He was awarded the J. G. Taylor Spink Award in 1979. He was elected to the National Sportscasters and Sportswriters Hall of Fame in 1997.

Broeg said he wished his epitaph to read, "Hopefully, he was fair, as in just, not as in mediocre." Bob Broeg died five hours after the final game of the 2005 World Series. He was 87.

Awards and honors
1964 Sportswriter of the Year award – Rockne Club
1969 University of Missouri Faculty Alumni Award
1971 University of Missouri journalism medal
1978 Missouri Sports Hall of Fame
1979 Cooperstown Baseball Writers Hall of Fame
1979 J. G. Taylor Spink Award – National Baseball Hall of Fame
1997 Sportswriters & Sportscasters Hall of Fame
1998 National Baseball Congress Hall of Fame

External links
Baseball Hall of Fame - Spink Award recipient
Bob Broeg Oral History Interview - National Baseball Hall of Fame Digital Collection
Bob Broeg Papers at The State Historical Society of Missouri

1918 births
2005 deaths
American sportswriters
Writers from Missouri
Writers from St. Louis
BBWAA Career Excellence Award recipients
St. Louis Post-Dispatch people
United States Marine Corps personnel of World War II